TIC-80 is a free and open-source fantasy video game console for making, playing, and sharing games on a limited platform that mimics the 8-bit systems of the 1980s. It has built-in code, sprite, map, music, and sound effect editors, as well as a command line interface that allow users to develop and edit games within the console. The games made in TIC-80 can be exported as virtual game cartridges and bundled for different platforms, including Android, Linux, MacOS, Windows, baremetal Raspberry Pi, Nintendo 3DS, RetroArch, and HTML5 (using WebAssembly). It supports programming languages including JavaScript, MoonScript, and Lua, as well as Ruby, Wren, Fennel, Squirrel and D. TIC-80 is often compared to PICO-8, a well known fantasy system which is not open source; both systems are becoming popular with games programmers who are interested in classic home computers and consoles.

Capabilities 
As a fantasy console, TIC-80 has some set limitations in terms of graphics and processing power in order to create a "retro-styled" gaming experience. These limitations include a 240x136 display; a 16 color palette; 256 8x8 sprites; and 4-channel sound. Integrated tools within the "tiny computer" allow developers to edit code, create graphics, write music, and build levels within games.

Specifications

Cartridges
The TIC-80 is capable of storing and loading back serialized dumps of memory regions using so called cartridges, another 80's metaphor. Unlike the original ones, which were actual physical objects, the TIC-80 cartridges are just files in .tic format. These can be created by typing "save filename.tic" on the console, and loaded back by typing "load filename.tic". Furthermore TIC-80 comes with a built-in cartridge browser, called "SURF" (see below). Free and Open Source tools to convert PICO-8 cartridges to TIC-80 cartridges exists, but they aren't perfect.

To push the metaphor one step further, this serialized memory dump can be embedded in a PNG picture (resembling a real physical cartridge) using steganography. However this isn't practical, because its storage capacity very limited (256 x 256 pixels, each 4 channels, and with 3 bits of data per channel, that's 256 * 256 * 4 * 3 bits / 8 = 98,304 bytes in total, although the memory dump is zlib compressed). Therefore you can find cartridges in the .tic format more often on the net, because .tic doesn't have such storage limitation.

Color palettes

Playing and sharing games 
TIC-80 runs on major operating systems including Windows, Linux 32 and 64 bit, Mac OS X, and Android, and can be compiled from source code for other platforms such as Raspberry Pi. "Tic" cartridge files, containing playable versions of the game, are generated using the integrated development tools. There is a large and growing catalog of community-made games available through the TIC-80 web site.

The TIC-80 console has been featured in demo parties such as Outline 2022 in the Netherlands; Lovebyte 2021 online; and a 2018 LINE Fukuoka hackathon in Japan.

References

Further reading
 "A Game Maker's Toolkit: Eight More Fascinating Game-Making Tools for the Pi". The MagPi. September 2018. Issue 73. pp. 32–33. – via Internet Archive
 Littler, Clarissa (August 2018). "Fantasy Computers and TIC-80". beanz Magazine (Vol. 6, No. 1)
 Littler, Clarissa (October 2018). "TIC-80 Project". beanz Magazine (Vol. 6, No. 2)
 Littler, Clarissa (February 2019). "TIC-80 Maps and Music". beanz Magazine (Vol. 6, No. 4) – via Proquest
 Pistorio, Marco (September 2018). "Fantasy Console: TIC 80". Retro Magazine (Vol. 2, No. 9) (in Italian). p. 20 – via Internet Archive

External links 

 
 GitHub Repository

2017 software
Fantasy video game consoles
Free and open-source software
Video game engines
Game engines for Linux
Virtual machines
Lua (programming language)-scriptable game engines